Zhuozi (died 651 BC) or Prince Zhuo was for a month in 651 BC the ruler of the State of Jin during the Spring and Autumn period of ancient China.  His ancestral name was Ji (姬) and given name was Zhuo (卓).  He was the son of Duke Xian of Jin, and his mother Shao Ji was the younger sister of Duke Xian's favored concubine Li Ji.

When Duke Xian died in the ninth month of 651 BC, Crown Prince Xiqi, the son of Li Ji, ascended the throne.  However, only a month later Xiqi was killed by the minister Li Ke (里克).  Chancellor Xun Xi (荀息) then installed Zhuozi, Xiqi's younger half-brother and cousin, on the throne.  But Zhuozi met the same fate as Xiqi: a month later he was also killed by Li Ke, and Xun Xi committed suicide.  After Zhuozi's death Li Ke installed his older half-brother Prince Yiwu on the throne, known as Duke Hui of Jin.  Duke Hui would later force Li Ke to commit suicide for the crime of killing Xiqi and Zhuozi.

References

Monarchs of Jin (Chinese state)
7th-century BC Chinese monarchs
651 BC deaths
Year of birth unknown